Zillman is a surname. Notable people with the surname include:

John Zillman (born 1939), Australian meteorologist
William Zillman (born 1986), Australian rugby league player

See also
Millman
Sillman
Zillmann (disambiguation)